Sacha Boris Roger Marasović (born 6 January 1998) is a professional footballer who plays as a midfielder for Tabor Sežana. Born in France, he was a youth international for Croatia.

Club career
Marasović started his career with the reserves of French Ligue 1 side Marseille. Before the second half of the 2019–20 season, Marasović signed for Inter Zaprešić in Croatia, where he suffered relegation to the Croatian second division. On 23 February 2020, he debuted for Inter Zaprešić in a 3–2 loss to Dinamo Zagreb. On 21 November 2021, Marasović scored his first goals for Inter Zaprešić in a 3–0 win over BSK.

International career
Marasović is eligible to represent Croatia internationally through his parents. In 2018, he made two appearances for the Croatian under-20 side in friendly matches against Russia.

References

External links
 

1998 births
Living people
Footballers from Paris
French people of Croatian descent
Association football midfielders
French footballers
Croatian footballers
Croatia youth international footballers
Olympique de Marseille players
NK Inter Zaprešić players
HNK Šibenik players
NK Tabor Sežana players
Championnat National 2 players
Croatian Football League players
First Football League (Croatia) players
Slovenian PrvaLiga players
Croatian expatriate footballers
Croatian expatriate sportspeople in Slovenia
Expatriate footballers in Slovenia